Dolno Palčište is a village in the municipality of Bogovinje, North Macedonia.

Demographics
	
As of the 2021 census, Dolno Palčište had 2,563 residents with the following ethnic composition:
Albanians 4,829
Turks 3
Macedonians 2
Persons for whom data are taken from administrative sources 91
Others 2

According to the 2002 census, the village had a total of 3,345 inhabitants. Ethnic groups in the village include:
Albanians 3,302
Macedonians 24
Others 19

Sports
The local football club KF Çakllani used to play in the Macedonian Third Football League.

References

External links

Villages in Bogovinje Municipality
Albanian communities in North Macedonia